Playing with Fire is a 1921 German silent comedy-drama film directed by Georg Kroll and Robert Wiene and starring Diana Karenne, Vasilij Vronski, Ossip Runitsch, and Anton Edthofer. It was shot at the Babelsberg Studios in Berlin. The film received a generally positive reception from critics, although some were doubtful about the blending of farce and tragedy.

Synopsis
A method actress likes living out the roles she is playing in real life. To prepare for her new play, she enters the criminal underworld and ends up being implicated in a burglary of a Duke who is one of her suitors.

Cast

References

Bibliography

External links

1921 films
Films of the Weimar Republic
German silent feature films
German comedy-drama films
Films directed by Robert Wiene
1921 comedy-drama films
German black-and-white films
Films produced by Erich Pommer
Silent comedy-drama films
1920s German films
Films shot at Babelsberg Studios
1920s German-language films